Heshui County is a county of Gansu province, China. It is under the administration of the prefecture-level city of Qingyang, and is the easternmost county-level division of the province. Its postal code is 745400, and its population in 1999 was 163,424 people.

Administrative divisions
Heshui County is divided to 8 towns and 4 townships.
Towns

Townships

Climate

Transportation 
China National Highway 211

See also
 List of administrative divisions of Gansu

References

  Official website (Chinese)

Heshui County
Qingyang